Oscar Chess Ltd v Williams [1957] EWCA Civ 5 is an English contract law case, concerning the difference between a term and a representation.

Facts
Williams sold Oscar Chess Ltd a Morris car for £290. It was described as a 1948 Morris 10, but it was really a 1939 model worth £175. Williams said it was 1948 in good faith, relying on the car log book, but the book was a forgery.

Judgment
Denning LJ said the term could only possibly be a warranty, whose ordinary meaning is ‘to denote a binding promise’. In Cross v Gardner Holt CJ held that ‘An affirmation at the time of a sale is a warranty, provided it appears on evidence to be so intended.’ And this was the ordinary English meaning of a binding promise. But in Heilbut, Symons & Co v Buckleton Lord Haldane LC and Lord Moulton said ‘warranty’ in a technical sense, distinguished from a condition. The crucial point of this case was not whether the representation was a warranty or condition, but a term of the contract at all. It followed that Williams’ statement was a mere representation.

It followed that the statement did not become a term because a reasonable man (objective test) in the position of the car dealer (Oscar Chess Ltd) would not have thought that a person with no experience in the car market would have guaranteed the truth of the statement.

Hodson LJ concurred and Morris LJ dissented because he thought the parties did intend it to be a warranty.

See also

English contract law
Routledge v McKay [1954] 1 WLR 615
Dick Bentley Productions Ltd v Harold Smith (Motors) Ltd [1965] EWCA Civ 2
Interpreting contracts in English law

Notes

English contract case law
Court of Appeal (England and Wales) cases
Lord Denning cases
1957 in case law
1957 in British law